This is a list of Members of Parliament (MPs) elected in the 1992 general election, held on 9 April.

During the 1992–97 Parliament, Betty Boothroyd was the Speaker, John Major served as Prime Minister, and Neil Kinnock, John Smith, Margaret Beckett, and Tony Blair served as Leader of the Opposition.  This Parliament was dissolved on 8 April 1997.

By nation 

 List of MPs for constituencies in Scotland (1992–1997)
 List of MPs for constituencies in Wales (1992–1997)

Composition 
These representative diagrams show the composition of the parties as it was directly after the 1992 general election and before the 1997 general election:

Note: The Scottish National Party and Plaid Cymru sit together as a party group. This is not the official seating plan of the House of Commons, which has five rows of benches on each side, with the government party to the right of the Speaker and opposition parties to the left, but with room for only around two-thirds of MPs to sit at any one time.



By-elections 
See the list of United Kingdom by-elections.

Two seats were vacant when Parliament was dissolved preparatory to the 1997 general election:
Meriden: Iain Mills (Con) died 13 January 1997
Don Valley: Martin Redmond (Lab) died 16 January 1997

One further MP died prior to the 1997 general election (who was standing down due to health problems, incidentally) during the period in which parliament was dissolved:
North Dorset: Nicholas Baker (Con) died 25 April 1997

Defections 
1995 Alan Howarth (Stratford-on-Avon) defects from Con to Lab.
1995 Emma Nicholson (Devon West and Torridge) defects from Con to Lib Dem.
1996 Peter Thurnham (Bolton North East) defects from Con to Lib Dem, with eight months as an independent.
March 1997 George Gardiner (Reigate) defects from Con to Referendum Party.

Progression of government majority and party totals 
The government voting total is the total number of Conservative MPs, minus the two Conservative Deputy Speakers. The opposition voting total is the total number of other MPs, minus the Speaker and the Labour Deputy Speaker. The majority is the difference between the former and the latter. See also here.

References

See also 

 List of MPs for constituencies in Scotland (1992–1997)

1992
 Main
1992 United Kingdom general election
UK MPs
Lists of UK MPs 1992–1997